Santa Rosa del Jilguero is a town in the municipality of San Martín de Hidalgo in the state of Jalisco, Mexico. It has a population of 47 inhabitants.

References

External links
Santa Rosa del Jilguero at PueblosAmerica.com

Populated places in Jalisco